The 1998–99 Ligat Nashim was the inaugural season of women's league football under the Israeli Football Association. The league was won by Maccabi Haifa, followed by Hapoel Tel Aviv, ASA Tel Aviv University and Maccabi Tel Aviv.

League clubs
The league was played by 12 clubs:

 ASA Tel Aviv University
 Beitar Jerusalem
 Bnot Ramla
 Hapoel Ashkelon
 Hapoel Jerusalem
 Hapoel Marmorek
 Hapoel Petah Tikva
 Hapoel Tel Aviv
 Maccabi Ahi Nazareth
 Maccabi Haifa
 Maccabi Netanya
 Maccabi Tel Aviv

References

Ligat Nashim seasons
1998–99 in Israeli women's football
women
Israel